Jesús Murillo may refer to:

Jesús Murillo Karam (born 1947), Mexican politician
Jesús David Murillo (born 1994), Colombian footballer

See also
Murillo (surname)